The 1792 United States elections elected the members of the 3rd United States Congress. Congress was broadly divided between a Pro-Administration faction supporting the policies of George Washington's administration and an Anti-Administration faction opposed to those policies. Due to this, the Federalist Party (generally overlapping with the Pro-Administration faction) and the Democratic-Republican Party (generally overlapping with the Anti-Administration faction) were starting to emerge as the distinct political parties of the First Party System. In this election, the Pro-Administration faction maintained control of the Senate, but lost its majority in the House.

In the presidential election, incumbent President George Washington was re-elected without any major opposition. Washington had considered retirement, but was convinced to seek re-election for the purpose of national unity. Though Washington went unchallenged, Governor George Clinton of New York sought to unseat John Adams as vice president. However, Adams received the second most electoral votes, and so was re-elected to office. Washington remained unaffiliated with any political faction or party throughout his presidency.

In the House, 37 seats were added following the 1790 census. The Anti-Administration faction picked up several seats, narrowly taking the majority from the Pro-Administration faction. However, Frederick Muhlenberg, who leaned closer to the Pro-Administration faction, was elected Speaker of the House.

In the Senate, the Anti-Administration faction picked up one seat, but the Pro-Administration faction maintained a small majority.

See also
1792 United States presidential election
1792–93 United States House of Representatives elections
1792–93 United States Senate elections

References

1792 elections in the United States
1792